Parnaenus is a genus of jumping spiders that was first described by George and Elizabeth Peckham in 1896.  it contains only three species, found only in South America, El Salvador, and Guatemala: P. cuspidatus, P. cyanidens, and P. metallicus.

References

External links
 Photographs of Parnaenus species
 Pictures of P. cyanidens

Salticidae genera
Salticidae
Spiders of Central America
Spiders of South America